The 2009 Canadian Senior Curling Championships was held March 21–28 at the Silver Fox Curling and Yacht Club in Summerside, Prince Edward Island. The winning teams represented Canada at the 2010 World Senior Curling Championships.

Men's

Teams

Standings

Results

Draw 1

Draw 2

Draw 3

Draw 4

Draw 5

Draw 6

Draw 7

Draw 8

Draw 9

Draw 10

Draw 11

Draw 12

Draw 13

Draw 14

Draw 15

Draw 16

Draw 17

Draw 18

Draw 19

Draw 20

Draw 21

Draw 22

Playoffs

Tiebreaker

Semifinal

Final

Women's

Teams

Standings

Results

Draw 1

Draw 2

Draw 3

Draw 4

Draw 5

Draw 6

Draw 7

Draw 8

Draw 9

Draw 10

Draw 11

Draw 12

Draw 13

Draw 14

Draw 15

Draw 16

Draw 17

Draw 18

Draw 19

Draw 20

Draw 21

Draw 22

Playoffs

Semifinal

Final

References

 Men's results
 Women's results 

2009
Senior Curling Championships
Sport in Summerside, Prince Edward Island
Curling competitions in Prince Edward Island